Wilkinson v. United States, 365 U.S. 399 (1961), was a court case during the McCarthy Era in which the petitioner, Frank Wilkinson, an administrator with the Housing Authority of the City of Los Angeles, challenged his conviction under 2 U.S.C. § 192, which makes it a misdemeanor to refuse to answer any question pertinent to the question under inquiry for any person summoned as a witness by Congress. The petitioner's conviction was sustained in a 5–4 ruling, upholding a prior ruling in Barenblatt v. United States.

The petitioner was indeed summoned to testify before a Subcommittee of the House of Representatives' Un-American Activities Committee, which was investigating alleged Communist infiltration into basic industries and Communist Party propaganda activities. The petitioner refused to answer a question as to whether he was a member of the Communist Party, contending that the Subcommittee lacked legal authority to interrogate him and that its questioning violated his First Amendment rights. He was convicted of a misdemeanor violation of 2 U.S.C. § 192. The Court also, on February 27, 1961, denied Braden v. United States, a companion case appealing a similar 2 U.S.C. § 192 conviction.

The underlying activities of the FBI and government agencies later resulted in a case, Wilkinson v. FBI, in which it was revealed that the FBI believed the witness that provided the assertion of Wilkinson's association with the Communist Party was "unreliable and emotionally unstable."

References

External links
 
Looking at Wilkinson v. United States in light of Wilkinson v. Federal Bureau of Investigation, Frank Wilkinson, Loyola of Los Angeles Law Review Vol. 33:681 January 2000
§ 192. Refusal of witness to testify or produce papers 2 U.S.C. § 192

Anti-communism in the United States
United States Supreme Court cases
United States federal criminal case law
United States Free Speech Clause case law
1961 in United States case law
United States Supreme Court cases of the Warren Court